The 2013–14 season was the Saba Football Club's 10th season in the Iran Pro League and their 10th consecutive season in the top division of Iranian football. They also competed in the Hazfi Cup and it was their 12th year in existence as a football club.

Club

Kit 

|
|
|}

Coaching staff

Other information

Grounds

Transfers

Summer

Competitions

Overall

Note: Current Position/Round Only use for team still a part of Competition.

Iran Pro League

Standings

Results summary

Results by round

Matches

Hazfi Cup

Statistics

Appearances and goals 
Last Update 17 June 2013

|-
! colspan="10" style="background:#dcdcdc; text-align:center;"| Goalkeepers

|-
! colspan="10" style="background:#dcdcdc; text-align:center;"| Defenders

|-
! colspan="10" style="background:#dcdcdc; text-align:center;"| Midfielders

|-
! colspan="10" style="background:#dcdcdc; text-align:center;"| Strikers

|-
|colspan="10"|Players sold or loaned out after the start of the season:
|}

Disciplinary record
Includes all competitive matches. Players with 1 card or more included only.

Last updated on 17 June 2013

See also
 2013–14 Iran Pro League
 2013–14 Hazfi Cup

References

External links
Iran Premier League Statistics
Persian League

2013-14
Iranian football clubs 2013–14 season